Carlos Alberto Castillo Ortíz (born September 30, 1975) is a Colombian football forward, who last played for Deportivo Pasto in the Copa Mustang.

Career
Born in Barbacoas, Nariño, Castillo began playing youth football with Estrella Azul.  He became a professional with Deportivo Cali.

References

External links

 

1975 births
Living people
Colombian footballers
Colombia international footballers
Deportivo Cali footballers
FBC Melgar footballers
L.D.U. Quito footballers
Deportivo Pereira footballers
Atlético Huila footballers
Real Cartagena footballers
Millonarios F.C. players
Categoría Primera A players
Peruvian Primera División players
Ecuadorian Serie A players
Colombian expatriate footballers
Expatriate footballers in Peru
Expatriate footballers in Ecuador
People from Barbacoas, Nariño
Association football forwards
Sportspeople from Nariño Department